In Her Time (foaled 9 September 2012) is a multiple Group 1 winning Australian thoroughbred racehorse.

Background
At the  2014 Inglis Classic yearling sale, In Her Time had a reserve price of A$ 40,000, however this was not met.

Racing career
In Her Time initially started her racing career under Newcastle trainer Ben Smith.  In 2017 the mare was ridden by Zac Purton to win the Group 1 Galaxy at Royal Randwick Racecourse.

In September 2018 trainer Ben Smith was stood down from training due to  elevated cobalt levels being found in two horses, giving false evidence and refusing to give evidence to stewards.

Fellow Newcastle trainer Kris Lees became the mare's new trainer and the horse was successful in winning her second Group 1 race the 2019 Black Caviar Lightning at Flemington Racecourse, ridden by Corey Brown.

In Her Time raced a further seven times without success, however she did run placings in the Group 1 VRC Sprint Classic behind Nature Strip and a narrow defeat in the Hawkesbury Crown at her final start.

Breeding career

After retiring from racing, In Her Time was sold to Newgate Stud Farm for A$2,200,000.

In Her Time gave birth to her first foal in 2021, a colt by stallion I Am Invincible.

Pedigree

References 

Australian racehorses
Racehorses bred in Australia
2012 racehorse births